La Vérendrye, La Verendrye or Verendrye may refer to:

People
Pierre Gaultier de Varennes, sieur de La Vérendrye (1685–1749), French Canadian military officer, fur trader and explorer, often called simply "La Vérendrye". His sons were:
Jean Baptiste de La Vérendrye (1713–1736), explorer
Pierre Gaultier de La Vérendrye (1714–1755), explorer and fur trader
François de La Vérendrye (1715–1794), explorer and trader
Louis-Joseph Gaultier de La Vérendrye (1717–1761), explorer and fur trader
 Verendrye brothers' journey to the Rocky Mountains, 1742–43

Places
La Verendrye (electoral district), in Manitoba, Canada
La Verendrye Provincial Park, in Ontario, Canada
La Vérendrye Trail, in Manitoba, Canada
La Vérendrye Wildlife Reserve, in Quebec, Canada
Parc de la Vérendrye (Le Domaine) Water Aerodrome, in Quebec, Canada
Verendrye, North Dakota, a ghost town in McHenry County
Verendrye National Monument, a former US national monument in North Dakota

Other
Verendrye Electric Cooperative, a public utility cooperative in North Dakota